Vestre Jakobselv Church is a parish church of the Church of Norway in Vadsø Municipality in Troms og Finnmark county, Norway. It is located in the village of Vestre Jakobselv. It is one of the churches for the Vadsø parish which is part of the Varanger prosti (deanery) in the Diocese of Nord-Hålogaland. The white, wooden church was built in a long church style in 1940. The church seats about 90 people. The building was designed by the Statens bygnignsinspektorat, a government agency now known as the Norwegian Directorate of Public Construction and Property. The church holds regularly-scheduled worship services every other Sunday.

See also
List of churches in Nord-Hålogaland

References

Vadsø
Churches in Finnmark
Wooden churches in Norway
20th-century Church of Norway church buildings
Churches completed in 1940
1940 establishments in Norway
Long churches in Norway